"You Don't Need Me Now" is a song co-written and recorded by American country music artist Clint Black.  It was released in January 1999 as the fifth and final single from the album Nothin' but the Taillights. The song reached #29 on the Billboard Hot Country Singles & Tracks chart.  The song was written by Black and Shake Russell.

Chart performance

References

1999 singles
1997 songs
Clint Black songs
Songs written by Clint Black
Song recordings produced by Clint Black
Song recordings produced by James Stroud
RCA Records singles